The Duchy of Lancaster is the private estate of the British sovereign as Duke of Lancaster. The principal purpose of the estate is to provide a source of independent income to the sovereign. The estate consists of a portfolio of lands, properties and assets held in trust for the sovereign and is administered separately from the Crown Estate. The Duchy of Lancaster is one of two royal duchies: the other is the Duchy of Cornwall, which provides income to the Duke of Cornwall, a title which is traditionally held by the Prince of Wales.

As of the financial year ending 31 March 2022, the estate was valued at £652.8 million. The net income of the Duchy is paid to the reigning sovereign as Duke of Lancaster: it amounts to about £24 million per year. As the Duchy is an inalienable asset of the Crown held in trust for future sovereigns, the sovereign is not entitled to the portfolio's capital or capital profits. The Duchy of Lancaster is not subject to tax, although the Sovereign has voluntarily paid both income and capital gains tax since 1993. As such, the income received by the Privy Purse, of which income from the Duchy forms a significant part, is taxed once official expenditures have been deducted.

The Duchy is administered on behalf of the sovereign by the chancellor of the Duchy of Lancaster, a government minister appointed by the sovereign on the advice of the prime minister, and by the clerk of the Council. Day-to-day management of the estate's properties and investments is delegated to officers of the Duchy Council, while the Chancellor is answerable to Parliament for the effective running of the estate.

The Duchy exercises some powers and ceremonial duties of the Crown in the historic county of Lancashire, which includes the current Lancashire ceremonial county, Greater Manchester and Merseyside as well as the Furness area of Cumbria. Since the Local Government Act 1972, the monarch in Right of the Duchy appoints the High Sheriffs and Lords Lieutenant in Greater Manchester, Merseyside and Lancashire.

History
As the Lancaster inheritance, the estate dates to 1265, when Henry III granted his younger son, Edmund Crouchback, lands forfeited by Simon de Montfort, Earl of Leicester. In 1266, the estates of Robert de Ferrers, 6th Earl of Derby, another protagonist in the Second Barons' War, were added. In 1267 the estate was granted as the County, Honour and Castle of Lancaster. In 1284 Edmund was given the Manor of Savoy by his mother, Eleanor of Provence, the niece of the original grantee, Peter II, Count of Savoy. Edward III raised Lancashire into a county palatine in 1351, and the holder, Henry of Grosmont, Edmund's grandson, was created Duke of Lancaster. After his death a charter of 1362 conferred the dukedom on his son-in-law John of Gaunt, Earl of Lancaster, and the heirs male of his body lawfully begotten for ever.

In 1399 the Duchy of Lancaster, held by John of Gaunt's son Henry of Bolingbroke, merged with the crown on his appropriation of the throne (after the dispossession from Richard II). His first act as Henry IV was to declare that the Lancastrian inheritance be held separately from the other possessions of the Crown, and should descend to male heirs. This separation of identities was confirmed in 1461 by Edward IV when he incorporated the inheritance and the palatinate responsibilities under the title of the Duchy of Lancaster, and stipulated that it be held separate from other inheritances by him and his heirs, but would however be inherited with the Crown, to which it was forfeited on the attainder of Henry VI. The Duchy thereafter passed to the reigning monarch, and in 1760 its separate identity preserved it from being surrendered with the Crown Estates in exchange for the civil list. It is primarily a landed inheritance belonging to the reigning sovereign (now Charles III).

In 2011, the Duchy established a rebalancing asset plan and sold most of the Winmarleigh estates farms in Lancashire, and donated a plot of land to the Winmarleigh Village Hall committee by June 2012.

In 2017, the Paradise Papers revealed that the Duchy held investments in two offshore financial centres, the Cayman Islands and Bermuda. Both are British Overseas Territories of which Queen Elizabeth II was monarch, and the governors of those territories were nominally her appointees. While Bermuda has been self-governing since 1620, the internal autonomy of the Caymen Islands is informal; also, Britain handles the foreign policy of both territories. Labour Party Leader Jeremy Corbyn, renowned for his leftism, posited that the Queen should apologise, saying that anyone who keeps money offshore for tax avoidance purposes should "not just apologise for it, [but] recognise what it does to our society." A spokesman for the Duchy said that all of their investments are audited and legitimate, and that the Queen voluntarily pays taxes on income she receives from Duchy investments. The Duchy's investments were revealed to include First Quench Retailing off-licences and rent-to-own retailer BrightHouse.

Role
The chief officer is the Chancellor of the Duchy of Lancaster, a position sometimes held by a cabinet minister but always a ministerial post. For at least the last two centuries the estate has been run by a deputy; its chancellor has rarely had any significant duties pertaining to its management but is available as a minister without portfolio.

The monarch derives the privy purse from the revenues of the Duchy. The surplus for the year ended 31 March 2015 was £16 million and the Duchy was valued at just over £472 million. Its land holdings are not to be confused with the Crown Estate, whose revenues have been handed to the Treasury since the 18th century in exchange for the receipt of a yearly payment.

The Duchy Council's primary officers carrying out the estate's day-to-day duties are the Clerk of the Council (the Chief Executive Officer), the Chairman of the Council, and the Chief Finance Officer. The chancellor is responsible for the appointment of the steward and the barmaster of the barmote courts on behalf of the sovereign in right of the Duchy.

Royal prerogative
Both the Duchy of Lancaster and the Duchy of Cornwall have special legal rights not available to other estates held by peers or counties palatine, for example, bona vacantia operates to the advantage of the Duke rather than the Crown throughout the Duchy. Proceeds from bona vacantia in the Duchy are divided between two registered charities. Bona vacantia arises, in origin, by virtue of the Royal Prerogative and in some respects remains the position although the right to bona vacantia of the two major categories is now based on statute: Administration of Estates Act 1925 and the Companies Act 2006.

Holdings

The holdings of the Duchy are divided into six units called surveys, five rural and one urban. The rural surveys make up most of the assets and area but the urban survey generates a greater income. The holdings were accrued over time through marriage, inheritance, gift and confiscation, and in modern times by purchase and sale.
 The holdings include the Lancashire foreshore from Barrow in Furness in the north to the midpoint of the River Mersey in the south.
 Minerals
 Lancaster Castle
 The Lancashire Survey is made up of five rural estates comprising a total of 
 Myerscough Estate – held since the 13th century.
 Salwick Estate
 Wyreside Estate
 Whitewell Estate –  in the Forest of Bowland
 The Cheshire Survey
 Crewe principal estate – now 
 Crewe Hall Farm offices
 The Southern Survey – located mainly in Northamptonshire and Lincolnshire,  of farm land
 Higham Ferrers estate, Northamptonshire – acquired in 1266 plus two additional farms, contains a Vocational Skills Academy, a venture with Moulton College and an 18-hole golf course. In November 2018, an agreement between the Duchy and the AFC Rushden & Diamonds football club resulted in land set aside for the purpose of creating a football field and facilities for the club.
 Ogmore Estate –  and has an active limestone quarry, Ogmore Castle and a golf course
 Castleton estate –  of grazing land
 Peveril Castle, Derbyshire
 Peak Cavern tourist attraction
 historic mineral rights
 Bolingbroke Castle, Lincolnshire
 Park Farm
 Donington
 Quadring Fen Farm
 Quadring
 Drayton House Farm, Swineshead
 The Staffordshire Survey –  in Staffordshire, 60 let houses, including a saw mill, equestrian centres, offices and a private airfield,  of forest
 Tutbury Castle, Staffordshire
 The Yorkshire Survey – 
 Goathland estate – 
 heather moorland, managed as grouse moors, most of which are a Site of Special Scientific Interest (SSSI)
 Cloughton estate –  of arable land on the Yorkshire coast
 Scalby Lodge
 Pickering estate – mix of arable and livestock farming 
 Pickering Castle, North Yorkshire
 Pontefract estate – a single large farm and several commercial properties
 Pontefract Castle
 Urban Survey
 The Savoy Estate, London
 Savoy Chapel
 Wellington House
 Harrogate Estate – a care home, hotel and a school
 Harrogate Ladies College
 The Stray,  of open space
 Granville and Villiers House, residential complex

Revenue surplus/income

Revenue surplus or income from the Duchy of Lancaster has increased considerably over time. In 1952, the surplus was £100,000 a year. Almost 50 years later in 2000, the revenue surplus had increased to £5.8M. In 2010, the revenue surplus stood at £13.2M and by 2017, the surplus had grown to £19.2M.

See also

 Clerk of the Council of the Duchy of Lancaster

References

Further reading
 Somerville, R. (1936). "The Cowcher Books of the Duchy of Lancaster". English Historical Review. 51: 598–615.
 Somerville, R. (1941). "The Duchy of Lancaster Council and Court of Duchy Chamber". Transactions of the Royal Historical Society. 4th Ser., 23: 159–77.
 Somerville, R. (1946). The Duchy of Lancaster. London.
 Somerville, R. (1947). "Duchy of Lancaster Records". Transactions of the Royal Historical Society. 4th Ser., 29: 1–17.
 Somerville, R. (1951). "Duchy and County Palatine of Lancaster". Transactions of the Historic Society of Lancashire and Cheshire. 103: 59–67.
 Somerville, R. (1953–70). History of the Duchy of Lancaster. 2 vols, London.
 Somerville, R. (1972). Office-Holders in the Duchy and County Palatine of Lancaster from 1603. Chichester.
 Somerville, R. (1975). "Ordinances for the Duchy of Lancaster". Camden Miscellany XXVI. Camden, 4th Ser., 14: 1–29.

External links
 Duchy of Lancaster – official website
 UK Parliamentary Archives, Duchy of Lancaster Plans

 

 
1351 establishments in England
Chancellors of the Duchy of Lancaster
History of Lancashire
Lancashire
Royal duchies of England
British landowners
Monarchy and money